José Edgardo Alberro (born June 29, 1969) is a former pitcher in Major League Baseball who played for the Texas Rangers. He batted and threw right-handed.

Professional career

Texas Rangers
On June 11,  Alberro signed with the Texas Rangers as an amateur free agent. In  he split time with the Rookie-league Gulf Coast League Rangers and the Advanced-A Charlotte Rangers. He went a combined 2–1 with a 2.75 ERA in 24 games, all in relief.

In  he split time with Advanced-A Charlotte and the Class-A Gastonia Rangers. He went a combined 2–1 with a 1.91 ERA and 16 saves in 45 games out of the bullpen.

Alberro was promoted to the Double-A Tulsa Drillers in  where in 17 games he compiled no decisions with a 0.95 ERA and five saves. His outstanding play soon saw him a promotion to the Triple-A Oklahoma City 89ers where in 12 games he did not involve in a decision, though his ERA did balloon to a combined 3.75.

In  he spent the entire season with the 89ers compiling a record of 4–3 with a 4.52 ERA and 11 saves in 52 games.

Alberro began the  season with the 89ers but was soon called up to the major league club on April 27. With the Rangers he involved in no decisions in 12 games,  innings pitched, and a 7.40 ERA. That same year with the 89ers he went 4–2 with a 3.36 ERA in 20 games, 10 for starts.

Most of Alberro's  season was spent with the 89ers, though he did have a short stint with the Rangers. In 29 games, 27 for starts, Alberro compiled a 9–9 record with a 3.47 ERA with the Triple-A club. At the Major League level he went 0–1 with a 5.79 ERA in five games, one start.

In  Alberro spent the first half of the season with the 89ers going 5–6 with a 4.22 ERA in 16 games, all for starts. His play at the Triple-A level received him a promotion to the Majors, going 0–3 with a 7.94 ERA in 10 games, four for starts. His last game was August 5, .

New York Yankees
After his last game with the Rangers they attempted to assign Alberro to the minors. He refused the assignment and on August 11, he was claimed on waivers by the New York Yankees. Alberro never played at the Major League level after he was waived. He spent the '97 season with the Triple-A Columbus Clippers of the International League. In one game with the Clippers he registered a loss, giving up five hits, four runs (three earned), in eight innings pitched.

He went 8–10 with a 4.52 ERA in 46 games, 13 for starts.

Detroit Tigers
Alberro began the  season in the Detroit Tigers' Minor League system, splitting time with both the Double-A Jacksonville Suns and the Triple-A Toledo Mud Hens. With Toledo, the team in which he spent most of his time, he compiled a 2–2 record with a 5.25 ERA in 14 games.

Florida Marlins
In  Alberro spent most of his time with the Triple-A Calgary Cannons. He was 3–2 with a 6.64 ERA in 24 games, eight for starts. The Marlins would become the last Major League organization Alberro would play for.

Atlantic League
He found some success coming out of the bullpen for the Arsenal going 3–6 with a 4.62 ERA in 49 games, pitching  innings.

In  he split time with the Atlantic City Surf and the Newark Bears. He pitched well for Atlantic City, in 12 games he was involved in no decisions and compiled a 1.93 ERA. For the Bears he was less than perfect going 3–2 with a dismal 9.42 ERA in 13 games, one start.

Mexican League
Alberro spent his last two professional seasons pitching in the Mexican League. In  he pitched 11 games for the Monclova Acereros where he compiled a 2–1 record with a 6.87 ERA.

In  with the Saltillo Saraperos he went 0–1 with a 7.20 ERA in seven games.

See also
 List of Major League Baseball players from Puerto Rico

External links

1969 births
Living people
Aberdeen Arsenal players
Acereros de Monclova players
Atenienses de Manatí (baseball) players
Atlantic City Surf players
Calgary Cannons players
Cangrejeros de Santurce (baseball) players
Columbus Clippers players
Gastonia Rangers players
Gulf Coast Rangers players
Jacksonville Suns players
Liga de Béisbol Profesional Roberto Clemente pitchers
Major League Baseball pitchers
Major League Baseball players from Puerto Rico
Mexican League baseball pitchers
Newark Bears players
Oklahoma City 89ers players
Charlotte Rangers players
Puerto Rican expatriate baseball players in Canada
Puerto Rican expatriate baseball players in Mexico
Saraperos de Saltillo players
Sportspeople from San Juan, Puerto Rico
Texas Rangers players
Toledo Mud Hens players
Tulsa Drillers players
Puerto Rican expatriate baseball players in Taiwan